Pool B of the 2019 Fed Cup Americas Zone Group I was one of two pools in the Americas zone of the 2019 Fed Cup. Four teams competed in a round robin competition, with the top team and the bottom team proceeding to their respective sections of the play-offs: the top team played for advancement to the World Group II Play-offs, while the bottom team faced potential relegation to Group II.

Standings 

Standings are determined by: 1. number of wins; 2. number of matches; 3. in two-team ties, head-to-head records; 4. in three-team ties, (a) percentage of sets won (head-to-head records if two teams remain tied), then (b) percentage of games won (head-to-head records if two teams remain tied), then (c) Fed Cup rankings.

Round-robin

Argentina vs. Puerto Rico

Brazil vs. Chile

Argentina vs. Chile

Brazil vs. Puerto Rico

Argentina vs. Brazil

Chile vs. Puerto Rico

References

External links 
 Fed Cup website

2019 Fed Cup Americas Zone